Tasuj (also Romanized as Tasūj, Tasooj, and Ţasūj; also known as Tasvīch) is a city in Tasuj District of Shabestar County, East Azerbaijan province, Iran. At the 2006 census, its population was 7,332 in 2,108 households. The following census in 2011 counted 7,370 people in 2,288 households. The latest census in 2016 showed a population of 7,522 people in 2,514 households.

References 

Shabestar County

Cities in East Azerbaijan Province

Populated places in East Azerbaijan Province

Populated places in Shabestar County